John William Leckie (born 23 October 1949) is an English record producer and recording engineer. His production credits include Magazine's Real Life (1978), XTC's White Music (1978) and Dukes of Stratosphear's 25 O'Clock (1985), the Stone Roses' The Stone Roses (1989), the Verve's A Storm in Heaven (1993), Radiohead's The Bends (1995), Cast's All Change (1995), Muse's Origin of Symmetry (2001) and the Levellers' We the Collective (2018).

Early life
Born in Paddington, London, Leckie was educated at the Quintin School, a grammar school in North West London, then Ravensbourne college of Art and Design in Bromley. After leaving school, he worked for United Motion Pictures as an audio assistant.

Career
Leckie began work at Abbey Road Studios on 15 February 1970 as a tape operator, later graduating to balance engineer and record producer. During his early career he worked as a tape operator with artists such as George Harrison (All Things Must Pass), John Lennon (John Lennon/Plastic Ono Band) and Syd Barrett (Barrett). He moved up to the desk to be balance engineer for Pink Floyd (Meddle and Wish You Were Here), for Mott The Hoople's album Mott and Paul McCartney and Wings' Red Rose Speedway and the single "Hi, Hi, Hi". Other engineering sessions at Abbey Road at this time were with Roy Harper, Soft Machine, Sammy Hagar, Jack Rieley's Western Justice album and the last recordings with Syd Barrett.

His first jobs as producer, in 1976,  were Be-Bop Deluxe's third album, Sunburst Finish, and Doctors of Madness' Figments of Emancipation. His collaboration with Be-Bop Deluxe continued with Modern Music, Live! In the Air Age and Drastic Plastic. In 1977 Leckie produced the Adverts' Crossing the Red Sea with the Adverts, Magazine's Real Life,.

Leckie left Abbey Road in 1978 and produced albums for Simple Minds (Life in a Day, Real to Real Cacophony and Empires and Dance). For Be-Bop Deluxe founder Bill Nelson, he produced the Red Noise album Sound on Sound and Nelson's subsequent solo album Quit Dreaming And Get On The Beam (the latter unreleased until 1981). Leckie recorded the début single, Public Image for Public Image Ltd and produced the Human League's Holiday 80 EP. Leckie's work with XTC included producing their debut 3D single and EP, and first two studio albums, White Music and Go 2. In 1981 he worked with the legendary Irish band The Atrix https://en.wikipedia.org/wiki/The_Atrix_(band) on their 3rd single Procession. Later he went on to produce 25 O'Clock and Psonic Psunspot, which XTC issued under the pseudonym The Dukes of Stratosphear in the mid 1980s.

In 1989 Leckie produced the Stone Roses' debut album The Stone Roses. The album was voted the best record of all time on a music poll taken by BBC Radio 6 Music and features as Number 1 on Observer's June 2004 “100 Greatest British Albums”. Some months later he produced and mixed their single "Fools Gold", which charted at No. 4 in the UK Singles Chart, and in early 1990 he produced and mixed the single "One Love" which also charted at no. 4 in UK. Leckie also worked on much of the recording the Stone Roses' album Second Coming,

In 1994, Leckie produced and engineered Radiohead's album, The Bends. In 1995, Leckie produced All Change by the Liverpool band Cast, which became Polydor Records' highest-selling debut album.

In 2019 Leckie produced Dark Times, the critically acclaimed comeback album by Doctors of Madness.

Awards
 1996 — Music Week Award for Best Producer
 1996 — Q Award for Best Producer
 1997 — Brit Award for Best Producer
 2001 — Music Managers Forum for Best Producer
 2011 — Music Producers Guild for UK Album of Year by The Coral
 2011 — BASCA Gold Badge Award

Albums produced

References

1949 births
English record producers
English audio engineers
Living people
Brit Award winners
People from Paddington
The Stone Roses